The Basilica Shrine of St. Mary is a Minor Basilica in the Catholic Church located in Wilmington, North Carolina, in the Diocese of Raleigh.  It was included as a contributing property in the Wilmington Historic District on the National Register of Historic Places in 1974.

Architecture

Its historic main church is of the Spanish Baroque style. It was designed by Spanish architect Rafael Guastavino, who is known for his work on the Biltmore Estate, Basilica of St. Lawrence, and Duke Chapel. The church was constructed without wooden or steel beams and without nails, instead using brick tile.

School
The Basilica Shrine of St. Mary also hosts the St. Mary Catholic School. The school hosts children from grades kindergarten to eighth grade. The school was founded by the Sisters of Our Lady of Mercy in 1869 under the request of Bishop James Gibbons. The school was named Academy of the Incarnation. Another school, for poor girls, called St. Peter's Parochial School for Girls was also created. These schools were later closed.

See also
List of Catholic cathedrals in the United States
List of cathedrals in the United States

References

External links
Roman Catholic Diocese of Raleigh, North Carolina

Baroque Revival architecture in the United States
Basilica churches in North Carolina
Spanish Revival architecture in the United States
Church buildings with domes
Churches in Wilmington, North Carolina
Roman Catholic cathedrals in North Carolina
Former cathedrals in the United States
Roman Catholic Diocese of Raleigh
Shrines to the Virgin Mary
Churches on the National Register of Historic Places in North Carolina
Historic district contributing properties in North Carolina